Koh-Lanta: Les Armes Secrètes is the twenty-second regular season and the twenty-sixth season overall of the French reality television series Koh-Lanta. For the first time since Cambodge, the series is filmed outside of Fiji, being filmed in Taha'a, French Polynesia. Twenty contestants from across France are split into two tribes to fight for food & win immunity to avoid tribal council whilst trying to not be voted off. The main twist this season is that there are secret weapons that can be used by the contestants to advance their game. Some of the weapons include, "Vote Hijacking" which allows a vote to be stolen from another contestant, the "Black Bracelet" allowing a hidden immunity idol to be cancelled after being played & the "Secret Ambassador" which allows a contestant to secretly save a contestant from elimination from the ambassadors without their realisation.  The grand prize is €100,000. The season premiered on 12 March 2021 on TF1.

Contestants

Challenges

Voting History

Future appearances
Vincent Blier returned for Fort Boyard.

Notes

References

External links

French reality television series
Koh-Lanta seasons
2021 French television seasons
Television shows filmed in French Polynesia